These are lists of territorial governors by century and by year, such as the administrators of colonies, protectorates, or other dependencies. Where applicable, native rulers are also listed.

For the purposes of these lists, a current dependency is any entity listed on these lists of dependent territories and other entities. A dependent territory is normally a territory that does not possess full political independence or sovereignty as a sovereign state yet remains politically outside the controlling state's integral area. This latter condition distinguishes a dependent territory from an autonomous region or administrative division, which forms an integral part of the parent state. The administrators of uninhabited territories are excluded.

Lists

List of leaders of dependent territories

List of current dependent territory leaders

List of governors of dependent territories in the 21st century

List of governors of dependent territories in the 20th century

2000 – 1999 – 1998 – 1997 – 1996 – 1995 – 1994 – 1993 – 1992 – 1991
1990 – 1989 – 1988 – 1987 – 1986 – 1985 – 1984 – 1983 – 1982 – 1981
1980 – 1979 – 1978 – 1977 – 1976 – 1975 – 1974 – 1973 – 1972 – 1971
1970 – 1969 – 1968 – 1967 – 1966 – 1965 – 1964 – 1963 – 1962 – 1961
1960 – 1959 – 1958 – 1957 – 1956 – 1955 – 1954 – 1953 – 1952 – 1951
1950 – 1949 – 1948 – 1947 – 1946 – 1945 – 1944 – 1943 – 1942 – 1941
1940 – 1939 – 1938 – 1937 – 1936 – 1935 – 1934 – 1933 – 1932 – 1931
1930 – 1929 – 1928 – 1927 – 1926 – 1925 – 1924 – 1923 – 1922 – 1921
1920 – 1919 – 1918 – 1917 – 1916 – 1915 – 1914 – 1913 – 1912 – 1911
1910 – 1909 – 1908 – 1907 – 1906 – 1905 – 1904 – 1903 – 1902 – 1901

List of governors of dependent territories in the 19th century

1900 – 1899 – 1898 – 1897 – 1896 – 1895 – 1894 – 1893 – 1892 – 1891
1890 – 1889 – 1888 – 1887 – 1886 – 1885 – 1884 – 1883 – 1882 – 1881
1880 – 1879 – 1878 – 1877 – 1876 – 1875 – 1874 – 1873 – 1872 – 1871
1870 – 1869 – 1868 – 1867 – 1866 – 1865 – 1864 – 1863 – 1862 – 1861
1860 – 1859 – 1858 – 1857 – 1856 – 1855 – 1854 – 1853 – 1852 – 1851
1850 – 1849 – 1848 – 1847 – 1846 – 1845 – 1844 – 1843 – 1842 – 1841
1840 – 1839 – 1838 – 1837 – 1836 – 1835 – 1834 – 1833 – 1832 – 1831
1830 – 1829 – 1828 – 1827 – 1826 – 1825 – 1824 – 1823 – 1822 – 1821
1820 – 1819 – 1818 – 1817 – 1816 – 1815 – 1814 – 1813 – 1812 – 1811
1810 – 1809 – 1808 – 1807 – 1806 – 1805 – 1804 – 1803 – 1802 – 1801

List of governors of dependent territories in the 18th century

1800 – 1799 – 1798 – 1797 – 1796 – 1795 – 1794 – 1793 – 1792 – 1791
1790 – 1789 – 1788 – 1787 – 1786 – 1785 – 1784 – 1783 – 1782 – 1781
1780 – 1779 – 1778 – 1777 – 1776 – 1775 – 1774 – 1773 – 1772 – 1771
1770 – 1769 – 1768 – 1767 – 1766 – 1765 – 1764 – 1763 – 1762 – 1761
1760 – 1759 – 1758 – 1757 – 1756 – 1755 – 1754 – 1753 – 1752 – 1751
1750 – 1749 – 1748 – 1747 – 1746 – 1745 – 1744 – 1743 – 1742 – 1741
1740 – 1739 – 1738 – 1737 – 1736 – 1735 – 1734 – 1733 – 1732 – 1731
1730 – 1729 – 1728 – 1727 – 1726 – 1725 – 1724 – 1723 – 1722 – 1721
1720 – 1719 – 1718 – 1717 – 1716 – 1715 – 1714 – 1713 – 1712 – 1711
1710 – 1709 – 1708 – 1707 – 1706 – 1705 – 1704 – 1703 – 1702 – 1701

List of governors of dependent territories in the 17th century

List of governors of dependent territories in the 16th century

List of governors of dependent territories in the 15th century

References

External links